Cabera is a genus of moths in the family Geometridae first described by Georg Friedrich Treitschke in 1825.

Selected species
In alphabetical order:
 Cabera borealis (Hulst, 1896) – boreal cream
 Cabera candidaria (Leech, 1897)
 Cabera erythemaria Guenée, 1857 – yellow-dusted cream
 Cabera exanthemata (Scopoli, 1763) – common wave
 Cabera griseolimbata (Oberthür, 1879)
 Cabera leptographa Wehrli, 1939
 Cabera purus (Butler, 1878)
 Cabera pusaria (Linnaeus, 1758) – common white wave
 Cabera quadrifasciaria (Packard, 1873) – four-lined cream
 Cabera schaefferi (Bremer, 1864)
 Cabera variolaria Guenée, 1857 – the vestal

References

Caberini